Brasilicia is a genus of leaf-dwelling lichens in the family Pilocarpaceae. It has 6 species. The genus was circumscribed in 2008 by lichenologists Robert Lücking, Klaus Kalb, and Emmanuël Sérusiaux, with B. brasiliensis assigned as the type species. The genus was originally circumscribed as monotypic; Edit Farkas transferred five species to Brasilicia from Bacidia in 2015.

Species
Brasilicia brasiliensis 
Brasilicia dimerelloides 
Brasilicia foliicola 
Brasilicia ituriensis 
Brasilicia olivaceorufa 
Brasilicia subsimilis

References

Pilocarpaceae
Lichen genera
Taxa described in 2008
Lecanorales genera
Taxa named by Emmanuël Sérusiaux
Taxa named by Klaus Kalb
Taxa named by Robert Lücking